William II (1196 – 3 September 1231) was the lord of Dampierre from 1216 until his death. He was the son of Guy II, constable of Champagne, and Mathilde of Bourbon.

His brother, Archambaud VIII, inherited Bourbon, and William inherited Dampierre. He married Margaret II, Countess of Flanders and Hainault, in 1223 and was thus regent of Flanders until his death as "Willem I" (or "Guillaume Ier"). In 1226 William and Margaret founded a Cistercian nunnery at Saint-Dizier. Their sons William III and John continued to confirm and patronize the nunnery during their lives, including William II's burial there in 1231. William and Margaret founded more Cisterian nunneries throughout the county of Flanders, including Flines Abbey.

He had four children (three sons) by Margaret and the eldest took part in the War of the Succession of Flanders and Hainault:
William III, Count of Flanders and Lord of Kortrijk
Guy, Count of Flanders and Margrave of Namur
John I, Lord of Dampierre, Viscount of Troyes, and Constable of Champagne
Joanna, married in 1239 to Hugh III of Rethel, then in 1243 to Theobald II of Bar

References

House of Dampierre
1196 births
1231 deaths